Thoughtcrime is a word coined by George Orwell in his 1949 dystopian novel Nineteen Eighty-Four. In the novel it describes politically unorthodox thoughts that contradict the tenets of Ingsoc (English Socialism). In contemporary English usage, it describes beliefs that are contrary to accepted societal norms.

Thoughtcrime, thoughtcrimes, thought crime, or thought crimes may also refer to:

 Thoughtcrimes, 2003 film directed by Breck Eisner
 Thought Crimes: The Case of the Cannibal Cop, 2015 documentary film about Gilberto Valle
 Thoughtcrime, alias for Richard McCaslin
 thoughtcrimes, band formed by Billy Rymer
 Thoughtcrime, blog by Harold Covington
 Thoughtcrimes, book distributor founded by Leigh Blackmore

See also
 Thought Criminals
 The Thought Criminals